Charles Drake (born Charles Ruppert; October 2, 1917 – September 10, 1994) was an American actor.

Biography
Drake was born in New York City. He graduated from Nichols College and became a salesman. In 1939, he turned to acting and signed a contract with Warner Bros., but he was not immediately successful. During World War II, Drake served in the United States Army. Drake returned to Hollywood in 1945 and was cast in Conflict which starred Humphrey Bogart. His contract with Warner Brothers eventually ended. In the 1940s, he did some freelance work, including A Night in Casablanca (1946).

In 1949, he moved to Universal Studios, where he co-starred with James Stewart and Shelley Winters in Winchester '73 (1950) and again co-starred with Stewart in the film Harvey (also 1950) a screen adaptation of the Broadway play. He co-starred in the Audie Murphy biopic To Hell and Back (1955), as Murphy's close friend "Brandon".

In 1955, Drake turned to television as one of the stock-company players on Montgomery's Summer Stock, a summer replacement for Robert Montgomery Presents and from 1957 he hosted the syndicated TV espionage weekly Schilling Playhouse (also known as Rendezvous). In 1956 Drake appeared as Tom Sweeny with Murphy and Anne Bancroft in Walk the Proud Land.

In 1959, he teamed again with Audie Murphy, this time in the Western film No Name on the Bullet, with Murphy in a rare villainous role as a hired assassin and Drake playing a small-town doctor trying to stop his reign of terror.

On November 14, 1961, Drake played state line boss Allen Winter in the episode "The Accusers" of NBC's Laramie Western series. On February 6, 1963, Drake played Hollister in the Wagon Train episode "The Hollister John Garrison Story". He also played Charles Maury in "The Charles Maury Story" in 1958, Season 1, episode 32.

Drake played the part of Oliver Greer in The Fugitive episode "The One That Got Away" (1967). He guest-starred in the fourth season (1968–1969) of NBC's Daniel Boone as Simon Jarvis. In 1969, Drake appeared as Milo Cantrell on the TV series The Virginian in the episode titled "A Woman of Stone." In 1970 he appeared as Randolf in "The Men From Shiloh" (the rebranded name of The Virginian) in the episode titled "Jenny." He played in eighty-three films between 1939 and 1975, including Scream, Pretty Peggy. More than fifty were dramas, but he also acted in comedies, science fiction, horror, and film noir. In an episode of the original Star Trek series ("The Deadly Years", 1967), he guested as Commodore Stocker.

He died on September 10, 1994, in East Lyme, Connecticut, at the age of 76.

Selected filmography

 Career (1939) - Rex Chaney
 Conspiracy (1939) - Police Guard (uncredited)
 The Hunchback of Notre Dame (1939) - Young Priest (uncredited)
 I Wanted Wings (1941) - Cadet (uncredited)
 Affectionately Yours (1941) - Hospital Intern (uncredited)
 Million Dollar Baby (1941) - Pamela's First Dance Partner (uncredited)
 Out of the Fog (1941) - Reporter (uncredited)
 Sergeant York (1941) - Scorer (uncredited)
 Dive Bomber (1941) - Pilot (uncredited)
 Navy Blues (1941) - Sea bag Inspection Officer (uncredited)
 Nine Lives Are Not Enough (1941) - 'Snappy' Lucas
 One Foot in Heaven (1941) - Second Bridegroom (uncredited)
 The Maltese Falcon (1941) - Reporter (uncredited)
 The Body Disappears (1941) - Arthur (scenes deleted)
 Dangerously They Live (1941) - Joe, Hospital Orderly with Dr. Murdock (uncredited)
 You're in the Army Now (1941) - Private (uncredited)
 The Man Who Came to Dinner (1942) - Sandy
 Bullet Scars (1942) - Harry a Reporter (uncredited)
 The Male Animal (1942) - Student (uncredited)
 Larceny, Inc. (1942) - R.V. Boyce - Driver in Accident (uncredited)
 Yankee Doodle Dandy (1942) - (uncredited)
 Wings for the Eagle (1942) - Customer (uncredited)
 The Gay Sisters (1942) - Man Entering Courtroom (uncredited)
 Busses Roar (1942) - Eddie Sloan
 Across the Pacific (1942) - Officer (uncredited)
 Now, Voyager (1942) - Leslie Trotter (uncredited)
 The Hard Way (1943) - Trailer Narrator (uncredited)
 Air Force (1943) - Navigator
 Conflict (1945) - Prof. Norman Holsworth
 You Came Along (1945) - Lt. R. Janoschek
 Whistle Stop (1946) - Ernie
 Winter Wonderland (1946) - Steve Kirk
 A Night in Casablanca (1946) - Pierre
 The Pretender (1947) - Dr. Leonard G. Koster
 The Tender Years (1948) - Bob Wilson
 The Babe Ruth Story (1948) - Reporter (uncredited)
 Tarzan's Magic Fountain (1949) - Mr. Dodd
 Johnny Stool Pigeon (1949) - Hotel Clerk (uncredited)
 Comanche Territory (1950) - Stacey Howard
 I Was a Shoplifter (1950) - Herb Klaxon
 Louisa (1950) - Voice of Radio Broadcaster (uncredited)
 Winchester '73 (1950) - Steve Miller
 Peggy (1950) - Tom Fielding
 Deported (1950) - Voice of Customs Official (uncredited)
 Mystery Submarine (1950) - Commodore (voice, uncredited)
 Harvey (1950) - Dr. Raymond Sanderson
 Air Cadet (1951) - Captain Sullivan
 The Fat Man (1951) - Radio Broadcaster at Racetrack (voice, uncredited)
 Little Egypt (1951) - Oliver Doane
 You Never Can Tell (1951) - Perry Collins
 The Treasure of Lost Canyon (1952) - Jim Anderson
 Red Ball Express (1952) - Pvt. Ronald Partridge / Narrator
 Bonzo Goes to College (1952) - Malcolm Drew
 Gunsmoke (1953) - Johnny Lake
 The Lone Hand (1953) - George Hadley
 It Came from Outer Space (1953) - Sheriff Matt Warren
 War Arrow (1953) - Sgt. Luke Schermerhorn
 The Glenn Miller Story (1954) - Don Haynes
 Tobor the Great (1954) - Dr. Ralph Harrison
 Four Guns to the Border (1954) - Jim Flannery
 To Hell and Back (1955) - Brandon
 Female on the Beach (1955) - Police Lieutenant Galley
 All That Heaven Allows (1955) - Mick Anderson
 The Price of Fear (1956) - Police Sgt. Pete Carroll
 Walk the Proud Land (1956) - Tom Sweeny
 Jeanne Eagels (1957) - John Donahue
 Until They Sail (1957) - Capt. Richard Bates
 Step Down to Terror (1958) - Johnny Williams Walters
 No Name on the Bullet (1959) - Luke Canfield
 Tammy Tell Me True (1961) - Buford Woodly
 Back Street (1961) - Curt Stanton
 Showdown (1963) - Bert Pickett
 The Lively Set (1964) - Paul Manning
 Dear Heart (1964) - Frank Taylor
 The Third Day (1965) - Lawrence Conway
 The Money Jungle (1967) - Harvey Sheppard
 Valley of the Dolls (1967) - Kevin Gillmore
 The Counterfeit Killer (1968) - Dolan
 The Swimmer (1968) - Howard Graham
 Hail, Hero! (1969) - Senator Murchiston
 The Arrangement (1969) - Finnegan
 The Seven Minutes (1971) - Sgt. Kellogg
 The Screaming Woman (1972, TV Movie) - Ken Bronson
 Scream, Pretty Peggy (1973, TV Movie) - George Thornton
 The Lives of Jenny Dolan (1975, TV Movie) - Alan Hardesty
 My Brother's Wedding (1983) - Pastor #2 (final film role)

References

External links
 
 

1917 births
1994 deaths
Male actors from New York City
American male stage actors
American male television actors
American male film actors
Nichols College alumni
20th-century American male actors
United States Army personnel of World War II
Western (genre) television actors